PISD is an acronym that may refer to:

Independent School Districts in Texas - P
P.I.S.D. Ltd Software Company
PISD (gene)